Mehura is a village in West Champaran district of Bihar, India.

Language is Bhojpuri and Hindi

Villages in West Champaran district